Gobichettipalayam is a state assembly constituency in Erode district in Tamil Nadu. Its State Assembly Constituency number is 106. It comes under Erode Lok Sabha constituency.
Most successful party: ADMK (10 times). It is one of the 234 State Legislative Assembly Constituencies in Tamil Nadu, in India.

Madras State

Tamil Nadu

Election results

2021

2016

2011

2006

2001

1996

1991

1989

1984

1980

1977

1971

1967

1962

1957

References 

 

Assembly constituencies of Tamil Nadu
Erode district